The University of Maine System (UMaine System or UMS) is a state university system in the U.S. state of Maine. It was created in 1968 by the Maine Legislature and consists of eight institutions, each with a distinct mission and regional character. Combined, there are approximately 33,000 students enrolled at these institutions.

Members

Administration
The system's board of trustees consists of 16 members; 15 are appointed by the governor and approved by the Maine Legislature with the Maine Commissioner of Education serving as a member ex officio. Members are appointed for a five-year term and may be reappointed once. A student member of the board is appointed for a single two-year term.

Chancellors

Notable trustees

References

External links
Official website

 
 
M